Kim Sun-min (born December 12, 1991) is a South Korean football player.

Club statistics

References

External links

1991 births
Living people
People from Suwon
Association football midfielders
South Korean footballers
South Korean expatriate footballers
J2 League players
Korea National League players
K League 1 players
K League 2 players
Gainare Tottori players
Ulsan Hyundai Mipo Dockyard FC players
Ulsan Hyundai FC players
FC Anyang players
Daejeon Hana Citizen FC players
Daegu FC players
Asan Mugunghwa FC players
Seoul E-Land FC players
Expatriate footballers in Japan
South Korean expatriate sportspeople in Japan
Sportspeople from Gyeonggi Province